Tekhnopark is a station on the Moscow Metro's Zamoskvoretskaya Line, between Avtozavodskaya and Kolomenskaya stations. The station was opened on 28 December, 2015. It was constructed in the middle of a metro stretch already in operation. Has entrances to the Dream Island amusement park, Andropov and Likhachov avenues and Mustay Karim street.

History
Construction began in February 2013. However, construction dates have changed, with construction begun in 2012. 

The grade-level station is primarily supposed to serve the Nagatino i-Land technopark (Science park).

The stations has been closed since 12 November 2022 due to the reconstruction works.

References

External links
 Nagatino i-Land Information

Moscow Metro stations
Zamoskvoretskaya Line
Railway stations in Russia opened in 2015